Glenicmurrin Lough or Lough Glenicmurrin is a lake in County Galway, Ireland.

Wildlife

Fish on Glenicmurrin Lough include sea trout, brown trout, grilse and Arctic char.

See also 
 List of loughs in Ireland

References 

Lakes of County Galway